Esther Morris Leidolf is a US-based medical sociologist, an intersex activist, writer, the founder of the MRKH Organization, and was the board secretary for the Intersex Society of North America.

Career 

Esther Morris Leidolf is a US-based medical sociologist and health worker, writer, the founder of the MRKH Organization, and was the board secretary for the now-defunct Intersex Society of North America. In roles with ISNA and MRKH Organization, Morris Leidolf spoke at conferences and events, including the LGBTI Health Summit. Works include The Missing Vagina Monologue. Morris Leidolf has stated,

Alongside other activists, Morris Leidolf was critical of a 2006 shift in clinical language from intersex to disorders of sex development. Morris Leidolf also appears in the award-winning 2012 documentary Intersexion and the 2019 Global MRKH Footprint video .

Selected bibliography

See also
MRKH
Intersex
Intersex rights in the United States
List of intersex people

References

External links
 Esther Morris Leidolf's research, at ResearchGate

Living people
Intersex academics
Intersex rights activists
Intersex rights in the United States
Year of birth missing (living people)
Intersex women
Intersex writers